My Nappy Roots: A Journey Through Black Hair-itage is a 2006 American documentary film directed by Regina Kimbell.

Overview
The film explores the politics and history of African American hair and how the European ideal of beauty influenced black hair through modern history.  It details the political and cultural influences that have dominated dialogue surrounding African and African American hairstyles from styling patterns and cultural trends to the business of black hair care industry.

Good Hair lawsuit
On October 5, 2009, Kimbell filed a lawsuit in a Los Angeles court against Chris Rock Productions, HBO Films, and his 2009 documentary Good Hair, as well as the film's American and international distributors. Kimbell charged that Rock's film was an illegal infringement of My Nappy Roots, which she claims to have screened for Rock before its release. While Kimbell sought to stop the wide release of Good Hair, a federal judge allowed Rock's film to be released as scheduled.

See also 

 Good Hair (2009 documentary)
 No Lye: An American Beauty Story (2019 documentary)

References

External links
 
 

2006 films
American documentary films
Documentary films about African Americans
2006 documentary films
African-American hair
Documentary films about human hair
2000s English-language films
2000s American films